Spilarctia hosei is a moth in the family Erebidae. It was described by Walter Rothschild in 1910. It is found on Borneo. The habitat consists of lowland forests.

References

Moths described in 1910
hosei